is an Echizen Railway Mikuni Awara Line railway station located in the city of Awara, Fukui Prefecture, Japan.

Lines

Station layout
The station consists of one unnumbered island platforms connected to the station building by a level crossing. The station is unstaffed. The wooden station building is protected by the government as a Registered Tangible Cultural Property.

Adjacent stations

History
Honjō Station was opened on December 30, 1928. On September 1, 1942 the Keifuku Electric Railway merged with Mikuni Awara Electric Railway. Operations were halted from June 25, 2001. The station reopened on August 10, 2003 as an Echizen Railway station.

Surrounding area
The station is surrounded by residences; further away lie fields spotted by grain elevators. Fukui Prefectural Route 101 lies to the north.
Other points of interest include:
Awara City Honjō Elementary School
Nakaban Community Center

See also
 List of railway stations in Japan

References

External links

  

Railway stations in Fukui Prefecture
Railway stations in Japan opened in 1928
Mikuni Awara Line
Awara, Fukui